Sonny Bunch is an American writer, editor, and journalist. He is best known for his interest and work in the film genre. As of 2019, Bunch is the Editor-in-Chief of Cinestate's Rebeller website and regularly contributes to the Washington Post.  His work has been featured in The Wall Street Journal, The Weekly Standard, The Washington Times, National Review, Commentary, New Atlantis, and the Washington Free Beacon, where he most recently served as executive editor.

Work 
Bunch was formerly an executive editor for the Washington Free Beacon, where he regularly reviewed movies. He has also served as a staff writer at the Washington Times, an assistant editor for books and arts at The Weekly Standard, and an editorial assistant at Roll Call.

Sonny briefly blogged for the America's Future Foundation's Conventional Folly. In 2007 he received a part-time fellowship from the Phillips Foundation to examine the burgeoning 9/11 Truther Movement. Bunch produces the Sub-Beacon, a podcast on which he, Jonathan V. Last and Victorino Matus review movies. Bunch has also written chapters for two of Last's books, The Seven Deadly Virtues: 18 Conservative Writers on Why the Virtuous Life is Funny as Hell and The Christmas Virtues: A Treasury of Conservative Tales for the Holidays.

In 2019, Bunch was hired by Cinestate CEO Dallas Sonnier as the editor-in-chief of the website for a new production label, Rebeller. The brand will function as a culture website with plans to produce films, publish books, create podcasts, and host live events for the “outlaw cinema” genre, which Bunch describes as “that which is made by people working outside of a system that has grown stifling and conformist.”

Filmography 

 2017: Red Eye w/ Tom Shillue (TV Series) (Himself)
 2018: S.E. Cupp Unfiltered (TV Series) (Himself)
 2019: Morning Joe (TV Series) (Himself)

References

Living people
American male journalists
University of Virginia alumni
American film critics
Year of birth missing (living people)